The Grand Canal Shoppes is an upscale shopping mall inside The Venetian Hotel & Casino and The Palazzo on the Las Vegas Strip in Paradise, Nevada.

The mall was opened along with the Venetian in 1999. The mall has indoor canals, where gondolas take people around the mall. The mall is anchored by a flagship, high-fashion Barneys New York store and contains many designer and upscale boutiques. Live performances can be found throughout the mall. In 2019, Barneys New York closed its doors as the department store filed for bankruptcy.

The mall had 20 million visitors a year in 2008.

History
Grand Canal Shoppes opened in 1999. The place was a Venetian-styled shopping mall with 91 shops for retail, dining, and entertainment. Retail includes Ann Taylor, Banana Republic, Sephora, and more.

General Growth Properties acquired the  mall from Las Vegas Sands in 2004 for $776 million.

In 2005, plans were made for an expansion to add 50 more shops for retail, dining, and more theater space. Plans were approved and built in 2007. The expansion was originally named "The Grand Canal Shoppes", but later was renamed "The Shoppes at the Palazzo" to reflect the name of the hotel. Now the mall has over 140 shops and eateries.

On May 16, 2013, General Growth sold half of its interest in the Grand Canal Shoppes, including the Shoppes at the Palazzo, in Las Vegas for net proceeds of $410 million as part of a new joint venture with TIAA-CREF.

Venetian Macao
A replica of the Grand Canal Shoppes is built at The Venetian Macao in Macau SAR, China.

Gallery

References

Las Vegas Strip
Brookfield Properties
Shopping malls in Las Vegas
Shopping malls established in 1999
1999 establishments in Nevada
Buildings and structures in Paradise, Nevada